Academy of Natural Sciences usually refers to the Academy of Natural Sciences of Drexel University.

Academy of Natural Sciences may also refer to:

 Russian Academy of Natural Sciences, Moscow
 Maine Academy of Natural Sciences, a charter high school in Hinckley, Maine, United States
 Swiss Academy of Natural Sciences
 Crater Academy of Natural Sciences, a high school in Oregon, United States